is the debut Japanese single by French Canadian Himeka. The single was released on May 27, 2009 under her label Sony Music Japan International. "Asu e no Kizuna" is the opening theme song for the anime adaptation of PlayStation 3 game Valkyria Chronicles. The B-side, "Sayonara Solitaire" is a cover of the ending theme song of Chrono Crusade sung by Saeko Chiba.

Track list

Charts

References

2009 debut singles
2009 songs
Sony Music Entertainment Japan singles